Becoming Saints is an American metalcore band that originated in Little Rock, Arkansas in 2003.

Background
Becoming Saints formed in 2003 in Little Rock, Arkansas. The band released their album Bury Them, Bury Them All independently and then went on a hiatus in 2006. During the band's hiatus, the members went on to new musical projects, most notably, bassist Jeff Bowie joining Soul Embraced. 

In 2013, the band reemerged and released an EP: Let This Not Be the End of Me. 

In 2016, the band announced they had signed to Rottweiler Records. Drummer Dylan Rylee left the band and was replaced by Jake Evans. Later in 2016, the band released a video for "Built for War" from their Oh, the Suffering album. 

In 2017, the band released a lyric video for "Vox Mortem".

Members

Former
 Dylan Rylee – drums (2003–2006, 2013, 2014–2016)
 Joe Maneiro – keyboards, percussion (2003–2006)
 Drew Garrison – vocals (2003–2006, 2013, 2014–2019)
 Jeff Bowie – bass guitar (2003–2006, 2013, 2014–2019)
 Allen Robsen – guitar (2003–2006, 2013, 2014–2019)
 Kory Olson – guitar, vocals (2003–2006, 2013, 2014–2019)
 Jake Evans – drums (2016–2019)

Discography
Studio albums
 Oh, the Suffering (October 21, 2016; Rottweiler)

EPs
 Bury Them, Bury Them All (2005)
 Let This Not Be the End of Me (2013)

Singles
 "Lost" (featuring Bruce Fitzhugh of Living Sacrifice) (2016)

Compilation appearances
 The Pack Vol. 1 (2016; Rottweiler)
 Metal From The Dragon (Vol. 2) (2017; The Bearded Dragon Productions)

References

Rottweiler Records artists
Musical groups established in 2003
Musical groups disestablished in 2006
Musical groups reestablished in 2013
Musical groups disestablished in 2013
Musical groups reestablished in 2014
American Christian metal musical groups
Metalcore musical groups from Arkansas
Musical groups from Little Rock, Arkansas